Prime Sports (originally known as the Prime Sports Network (PSN), and also known as Prime Network or simply Prime) is the collective name for a former group of regional sports networks in the United States that were owned by Liberty Media, operating from November 1988 to October 31, 1996. While Liberty owned many of these networks, some of Prime's member networks were owned by other companies, and carried programming distributed for the group through affiliation agreements. As a result, Prime-affiliated networks had the right to select Prime Network programs to broadcast.

Each of the networks primarily carried regional broadcasts of sporting events from various professional, collegiate and high school sports teams (with broadcasts typically exclusive to each individual network, although some were shown on multiple Prime networks within a particular team's designated market area), along with regional and national sports discussion, documentary and analysis programs.

History

Early history
The group's history traces back to the original Prime Ticket (now Fox Sports West), a Los Angeles-based sports network that launched on October 19, 1985. The channel was founded as a joint venture between Jerry Buss, majority owner of the Los Angeles Lakers and Los Angeles Kings, and cable television pioneer Bill Daniels, who held a minority ownership interest in both professional sports franchises, which carried most of their NBA and NHL games on the network. Prime Ticket was headquartered in a small office building across the street from the Great Western Forum in Inglewood, then the home stadium of the Kings and Lakers.

Prime Ticket caught on with cable subscribers in Southern California as it was founded at the height of the Lakers' 1980s championship run, and later got a boost from the trade of Wayne Gretzky to the Kings in 1988. It was also unique among regional sports networks, in that it operated as a basic cable channel, instead of a premium service as many of the RSNs operating at the time did.

Within a few years, Daniels bought out most of Buss's shares in Prime Ticket and became the channel's majority owner. In 1989, Daniels partnered with cable television provider Tele-Communications Inc. to form a new group of regional sports networks. Prime Ticket served as the flagship charter network, joined by the Prime Sports Network (now AT&T SportsNet Rocky Mountain), an owned-and-operated outlet based in Denver, near TCI's corporate headquarters in the suburb of Englewood. The partnership also purchased Dallas-based Home Sports Entertainment and its share of Orlando-based Sunshine Network. HSE had been in operation since 1983, while Sunshine had debuted in 1988. These four networks formed the cornerstones of the Prime Network group, along with several others already owned by TCI. Prime quickly obtained rights to the Pac-10 Conference football and secured affiliation agreements with other major regional sports networks including Home Team Sports (Baltimore), MSG Network (New York), New England Sports Network (Boston), and Pro-Am Sports System (Detroit) Prime formed a partnership with Raycom Sports that allowed to two companies to jointly-bid on rights and gave Prime the right to broadcast out-of-market games that Raycom already held rights to. Through this partnership Prime broadcast sporting events from the  Southwest and Big Eight conferences.

In 1991, Prime merged its San Francisco-based Pacific Sports Network (co-owned with Viacom) with Rainbow Programming's SportsChannel Bay Area forming SportsChannel Pacific. This would be the first joint-venture between Prime and its rival SportsChannel. Negotiations about a larger partnership continued. Finally, in 1993, Liberty Media, NBC, and Rainbow formed Prime SportsChannel Networks, a joint venture in which the companies pooled programming and advertising sales between Prime and Cablevision/NBC's SportsChannel. Bill Daniels exited the partnership just before the deal was announced. Through this partnership, the two companies formed two national sports-related channels, the sports news service NewSport and American Sports Classics, a network focusing on replays of past sporting events and historical sports documentaries.

In August 1994, Daniels sold his share in Prime Ticket and the Prime Network to TCI sister company Liberty Media. On November 16, 1994, Liberty Media announced that it would adopt a unified identity for its owned-and-operated regional sports networks under the "Prime Sports" brand. The move was part an alignment of the networks that would include a shift towards a common schedule of programming across the networks, outside each outlet's own regionally exclusive sports telecasts (including the incorporation of sports-related programs aimed at women and children, and the launch of a twice-nightly national sports news program, titled Press Box; the name originated from a local sports highlights show on Prime Ticket that began airing in 1990). Liberty also created an in-house sales service to sell national advertisements for the regional networks (replacing Group W Sports Marketing). The rebrand took effect in spring 1995.

In 1995, Prime Network's retail subsidiary, Prime Sports Merchandising, purchased select sports apparel stores that maintained locations inside shopping malls throughout the United States, and rebranded them as Prime Sports Shops, using the regional networks to promote the stores.

Restructuring into Fox Sports Net
On October 31, 1995, News Corporation, which sought to create its own group of regional sports networks as a cable venture for Fox Sports, which was formed the year prior through the Fox Broadcasting Company's acquisition of the television rights to the NFL's National Football Conference, acquired a 50% ownership interest in Liberty's U.S.-based regional Prime Sports networks and its international networks Premier Sports (Australia), Prime Deportiva (Latin America) and Prime Sports Asia. Liberty and News Corporation created Fox/Liberty Networks as a holding company for the co-owned regional sports properties. In exchange, News Corporation also sold a 7.5% interest in Star TV to Liberty Media.

On July 3, 1996, News Corporation and Liberty Media announced that the Prime Sports networks would be relaunched as part of the new Fox Sports Net group, with the eight Prime Sports owned-and-operated networks adopting brands that combined the "Fox Sports" name with the state or region served by the respective network. the Prime Sports-branded affiliates were officially relaunched as Fox Sports Net on November 1, 1996.

On December 22, 2006, News Corporation sold its interests in FSN Pittsburgh (the former "Prime Sports KBL"), FSN Utah (the former "Prime Sports Intermountain West"), FSN Northwest (the former "Prime Sports Northwest") and FSN Rocky Mountain (the former "Prime Sports Rocky Mountain") to Liberty Media, in an asset trade in which News Corporation also traded its 38.5% ownership stake in satellite provider DirecTV for $550 million in cash and stock, in exchange for Liberty Media's 16.3% stake in the company. Liberty later spun off the four networks in a partial asset spin-off of DirecTV into a separate company of the same name, while Liberty also increased its share in DirecTV from 48% to 54%, and Liberty owner John Malone and his family acquired an additional 24% interest. DirecTV Sports Networks, which assumed responsibility for the four Prime-turned-FSN networks, rebranded them under the Root Sports brand on April 1, 2011.

Networks

Owned-and-operated

Affiliates

International

Prime Sports Showcase
Prime Sports Showcase was a short-lived sports network that focused on women's sports. It was launched in November 1994. The network reached 45 million homes. Other programming on the Showcase network included Spanish Language programming and sporting events originating from Spanish speaking countries. The channel folded in late 1996.

Notable programming
The Prime Network was revolutionary in the sense that it was one of the first sports networks to provide live national coverage of regional auto racing series (such as the NASCAR West Series) and lower-division national series (such as the ARCA stock car series). It was also the exclusive live broadcast home to the USAR Hooters ProCup Series from the series' inception in 1994 until Prime Sports converted into Fox Sports Net in November 1996, when ESPN2 secured the rights to the series (running the series' races from 1997 to 1999). In addition, Prime also televised a great deal of American Speed Association races during the late 1980s and most of the 1990s, sharing the broadcast rights with TNN (now Paramount Network). The network also was the first to televise NASCAR Winston Cup qualifying sessions on a regular basis, mainly for races televised by TBS. Prime also televised a number of NASCAR Busch Series races, including the Goody's 300 at Daytona, in the early 1990s.

Prime was well known for its broadcasts of both American and Canadian equestrian competitions, at a level not since matched by any other North American television network, helping the Prime group develop a significant reputation among followers of that sport. Prime also televised a number of regional National Hockey League, college basketball and college football games, along with bodybuilding and wrestling matches. It would also occasionally air fitness programs (such as Body by Jake). The network also was an early broadcaster of Arena Football League games up through the early 1990s.

References

Defunct television networks in the United States
Sports television networks in the United States
Defunct local cable stations in the United States
Television channels and stations established in 1989
Television channels and stations disestablished in 1996
SportsChannel
NASCAR on television
Arena football on television
National Hockey League on television
College basketball on television in the United States
American Professional Soccer League
 
Bally Sports
Turner Sports
Former Liberty Media subsidiaries
1996 disestablishments in Colorado
1989 establishments in Colorado